The second Central American and Caribbean Games were held in Havana, Cuba from 15 March to 5 April 1930.  The event featured 596 athletes from nine nations (Costa Rica, Cuba, El Salvador, Guatemala, Honduras, Jamaica, Mexico, Panama, and Puerto Rico), competing in ten sports. Women participated in the event for the first time.

Football (soccer) was added.

Sports

Medal table
Final Medal Table

See also
 Leonel "Bebito" Smith

References

 
Central American and Caribbean Games, 1930
1930
Central American and Caribbean Games, 1930
1930 in Caribbean sport
1930 in Cuba
1930 in Central American sport
Multi-sport events in Cuba
20th century in Havana
Central American and Caribbean Games
Central American and Caribbean Games
Sports competitions in Havana